Fatima Payman (born ) is an Afghan-born Australian politician and Senator of the Australian Senate after the 2022 Australian federal election. A member of the Labor Party, she was declared elected to the Senate for Western Australia on 20 June 2022 and began her term on 1 July. She became the Australian Parliament's first hijab-wearing Muslim woman.

Early life and family
Payman's grandfather was a member of parliament in Afghanistan.

Fatima Payman was born in Kabul, Afghanistan around 1995, the eldest of four children, and fled the Taliban for Pakistan with her family when she was five years old. Her father arrived in Australia via boat in 1999 and spent time in immigration detention, after which he worked as a security guard, kitchen hand and taxi driver, so he could afford to sponsor the migration of his wife and four children. The rest of the family arrived in Australia in 2003, when she was eight, and settled in Perth. Once in Australia, her mother started a business giving driving lessons. In 2018, her father died of leukemia.

Education and career
Payman graduated from the Australian Islamic College Perth, where she was head girl, in 2013. She studied pharmacy, planning to head towards medicine, but instead got involved in politics. She has a Bachelor of Arts in anthropology and sociology and a Graduate Diploma of Pharmaceutical Sciences.

Payman joined the United Workers Union in 2018 as an organiser and was also president of Young Labor WA, both organisations she joined due to the exploitation she saw her father experience in various jobs. She has also worked as a program coordinator at the Edmund Rice Centre WA and as electorate officer for Pierre Yang. She is a board member of the Australian Islamic College.

Political career
Payman was third on the Labor party's ticket for the Senate at the 2022 Australian federal election and thus not expected to win a seat. She intended to use the 2022 election campaign as "practice" before seriously running in 2025.

Payman was naturalised as an Australian citizen in 2005, although this did not automatically revoke her Afghan citizenship.  As Section 44 of the Constitution of Australia requires all candidates to be a citizen of Australia only, she approached the Afghanistan embassy in Australia in October 2021 to renounce her Afghan citizenship. The embassy advised her that they could not finalise the renunciation because it had no contact with the new Taliban government that seized control of the country in August. The Labor Party received legal advice that Payman was nevertheless still eligible to be elected, as she had taken all reasonable steps to renounce her Afghan citizenship, noting that the Afghan Embassy in Australia did not even know whether the various departments and officers who would be tasked with processing her application in Kabul even exist following the takeover of Afghanistan by the Taliban.

Payman won the sixth and final Senate vacancy after a swing of 6.92% to Labor and a 9.24% swing against the Liberal party in Western Australian Senate voting. Her election was the first time the ALP won three Senate seats in WA since the Senate had been expanded in 1984. Elected at age 27, she is third youngest Senator in Australian history and will be the youngest serving Senator. She has said her priorities will include "getting more people from diverse backgrounds involved in politics, improving early childhood education, and climate change." She has also said she wants to "normalise hijab wearing".

References

Australian Labor Party politicians
Afghan emigrants to Australia
Afghan expatriates in Pakistan
Australian people of Afghan descent
Members of the Australian Senate for Western Australia
Naturalised citizens of Australia
Australian Labor Party members of the Parliament of Australia
Australian Muslims
Living people
Labor Left politicians
Women members of the Australian Senate
1995 births
Members of the Australian Senate